Vig may refer to:
 Vigorish, or "vig", a fee charged by a bookmaker for services
 Ben Vig, American politician
 Butch Vig, music producer and drummer for rock band Garbage
 John Vig, American physicist
 Miklós Vig, Hungarian cabaret and jazz singer, actor, comedian and theater secretary from the 1920s to the 1940s
 Vigilance Control (see Dead man's switch), also known as Driver's Safety Device (DSD)
 Vector inversion generator, an electric pulse compression and voltage multiplication device
 Vienna Insurance Group, also known as Wiener Städtische Versicherung AG, an Austrian insurance firm
 VIG (Video Interaction Guidance), an interactive method to increase mother-child attachment and other therapeutic gains.
 
Juan Pablo Pérez Alfonzo Airport IATA code

eo:VIG